The Sun Rises (German: Die Sonne geht auf) is a 1934 German musical film directed by Willy Reiber and starring Charles Kullmann, Reva Holsey and Fritz Kampers. It is in the tradition of operetta films.

Cast
 Charles Kullmann as Günther Peters 
 Reva Holsey as Marie-Luise 
 Fritz Kampers as Gustav 
 Jessie Vihrog as Lieschen 
 Sophie Pagay as Günthers Mutter 
 Jakob Tiedtke as Marie-Luises Vater 
 Rudolf Platte as Sauerwein 
 Max Gülstorff as Der Manager 
 Erich Bartels as Der Ansager

References

Bibliography 
 Waldman, Harry. Nazi Films in America, 1933-1942. McFarland, 2008.

External links 
 

1934 films
1934 musical films
German musical films
Films of Nazi Germany
1930s German-language films
Films directed by Willy Reiber
Operetta films
German black-and-white films
1930s German films